

Historical and architectural interest bridges

Major bridges

References 

 

 Others references

See also 
 Geography of Yemen
 Transport in Yemen
 List of wadis of Yemen

Yemen

Bridges
b